TimeTripper is a series of science fiction books by Stefan Petrucha following Harry Keller, a teenager who can see time itself and his love interest Siara Warner, who helps him through some tough situations. Harry, not always aware of the significance of events, travels between linear time and A-Time to fix the outcome of events in the lives of others.

Plot

TimeTripper 1: Yestermorrow

Siara Warner, a high school junior, becomes attracted to a fellow student, Harry Keller, after witnessing him prevent a shooting, seemingly by accident. Harry, in fact, has been given the ability to see time beyond its linear form, and used this ability to change the future. He is still getting a handle on the ability, which, as he is well-aware, could also be the manifestation of schizophrenia or another mental illness. After he reaches a plane of existence he calls A-Time, he nevertheless decides to take his ability as truth. However, while navigating this new universe, where every moment co-exists simultaneously, Harry detects a temporal anomaly involving a school outcast. Meanwhile, he semi-successfully explains his condition to Siara, who believes him insane until he successfully brings her into A-Time, where both struggle to prevent predestined events from occurring. Yestermorrow was published in 2006.

TimeTripper 2: InRage

After a series of apparently random occurrences of public violence, Harry discovers that in A-Time, anger is being transmitted from person to person like a disease, resulting in violent events in reality. Additionally, the level of rage increases with each infection, causing progressively more violent outbursts in the high school population. As Harry tries to come up with a way to stop the chain of rage, Siara also attempts to mend their relationship, and a psychologist attempts to get Harry put back in a mental institution. InRage was published in 2006.

TimeTripper 3: BlindSighted

Finally resigned to the fact that his crush is dating his worst enemy, Harry falls for another girl, Elijah, who is attracted to him. After he begins seeing glimpses of a warehouse fire in the future which will kill numerous people, Harry deduces that a single individual, capable of manipulating A-Time as he is, has been causing the abnormal temporal occurrences thus far. He employs the help of Elijah, whom he teaches about A-Time. Meanwhile, Siara attempts to repair their friendship as her suspicions towards Elijah grow. BlindSighted was published in 2006.

TimeTripper 4: FutureImperfect

Harry, drugged, delirious, and trapped in Windfree mental hospital, is incapable of entering A-Time, and though he knows the identity of the ' 'Daemon' ', he is dismissed as insane by his few visitors. After his mind is inexplicably brought back to A-Time despite the hospital medication, he is informed by a mysterious Archetype form about the finer points of reality. Following this, Harry successfully breaks free from the hospital and struggles to prevent the Daemon from inciting another disastrous event. FutureImperfect was published in 2007.

Main characters
Harry Keller - The protagonist of the series, Harry is usually in a state of craziness.  If it is not in linear time, it is in A-Time.
Siara Warner – Siara helps out Harry throughout the series and is Harry's crush.
The Initiate – likes to mess around with the fabric of time.  He hates Harry and tries to kill him numerous times.
Jeremy Gronson – RAW alpha male – a senior, an amazing academic and an athlete.  He is the school's star quarterback and the captain of the debate team.  He is also Harry Keller's worst enemy, after he starts dating Siara in the second book in the TimeTripper series
Todd Penderwhistle – one of the secondary characters in the first book of the TimeTripper series.  He is the trouble-maker and if not for Harry, he would also be a murderer.
Mr. Tippicks – he is the counselor who is booted from being a teacher and shoved into a small office.  He understands Harry and tries to help him any way he can.

References

Young adult novel series
Science fiction book series
American science fiction novels
American young adult novels
Children's science fiction novels
2000s science fiction novels
Novels about time travel
American novel series